Coleophora molothrella is a moth of the family Coleophoridae. It is found on Honshu island of Japan.

Adults are on wing from late July to August.

The larvae feed on the leaves of Aster glehni, Aster ageratoides and Kalimeris pinnatifida. They create a slender tubular case with a trilobed anal end. It is generally light ochreous-brown. Feeding results in a blotch mine which is made in June.

References

molothrella
Moths described in 1988
Moths of Japan